"Caution" is a song by American rock band the Killers from their sixth studio album, Imploding the Mirage (2020). It was released on March 12, 2020, as the lead single from the album, and features a guitar solo by former Fleetwood Mac guitarist Lindsey Buckingham.  The track topped the Billboard Rock Airplay and Alternative Airplay charts.

Background
The cover artwork is "Golden Breeze" by American artist Thomas Blackshear.

Music video

The music video is a sneak peek from a forthcoming short film with director Sing Lee tied to the Killers upcoming album Imploding the Mirage. The film will premiere on Apple Music. The music video has snippets reminding of an Americana theme. There are a number of stories going on. A stage play is being enacted, a story of young love, some family drama and family intrigue with police intervening and so on. There is also footage of the Killers performing at what is seemingly a local venue.

In popular culture
This song appears in video games Dirt 5, Forza Horizon 5 and as DLC for Rock Band 4

Awards

Pitchfork ranked Caution the 94th best song of 2020.

Credits and personnel
Credits adapted from the liner notes of Imploding the Mirage.

Recording locations
 Recorded at Subtle McNugget Studios (Los Angeles), Electro-Vox Recording Studios (Los Angeles), and Battle Born Studios (Las Vegas)
 Mixed at Subtle McNugget Studios (Los Angeles)
 Mastered at The Lodge (New York City)

Personnel
The Killers
 Brandon Flowers – vocals, synth
 Ronnie Vannucci Jr. – drums, percussion
 Mark Stoermer – bass, guitar

Additional personnel

 Jonathan Rado – production, string synth, acoustic guitar, slide guitar, drones
 Shawn Everett – production, recording, mixing
 Ivan Wayman – engineering
 Robert Root – engineering
 Lindsey Buckingham – guitar
 Blake Mills – guitar, bass, bass IV
 Lucius – background vocals
 Emily Lazar – mastering

Charts

Weekly charts

Year-end charts

Release history

References

2020 singles
2020 songs
Island Records singles
The Killers songs
Songs written by Brandon Flowers
Songs written by Ronnie Vannucci Jr.